James Johnson (born July 20, 1971) is an American college basketball coach and former head coach of the Virginia Tech Hokies men's basketball team. He was hired in 2012 to succeed Seth Greenberg, on whose staff Johnson had worked until leaving for Clemson, only to be hired back 12 days later. Johnson was fired by Virginia Tech on March 17, 2014 after two seasons with an overall record of 22-41.

James Johnson joined the University of Miami basketball program as the team’s director of basketball operations in June 2015. Johnson, who was on Jim Larrañaga’s staff for two seasons at George Mason University, including the historic NCAA Final Four run in 2006, came to Miami after seven seasons on staff at fellow Atlantic Coast Conference school Virginia Tech, where he was the head coach for two seasons after five years as an assistant coach.

On Monday, March 27, Kevin Keatts announced that James Johnson had been hired as an assistant coach for the NC State Wolfpack men's basketball program. Johnson and Keatts were teammates for two seasons at Ferrum College in Ferrum, Va., from 1991-93. Johnson comes to the Wolfpack after two years as the Director of Basketball Operations for Jim Larrañaga's program at Miami.

Johnson played collegiate basketball at Ferrum College, where he was a three-year starter and is a member of the Ferrum hall of fame.

Head coaching record

References

External links
 Virginia Tech profile
 Miami Hurricanes Profile
 N.C. State Profile
 Ferrum Hall of Fame profile

1971 births
Living people
African-American basketball coaches
American men's basketball players
Basketball coaches from Virginia
Basketball players from Virginia
College men's basketball head coaches in the United States
College of Charleston Cougars men's basketball coaches
Elon Phoenix men's basketball coaches
Ferrum Panthers men's basketball players
George Mason Patriots men's basketball coaches
High school basketball coaches in the United States
Longwood Lancers men's basketball coaches
NC State Wolfpack men's basketball coaches
Old Dominion Monarchs men's basketball coaches
Penn State Nittany Lions basketball coaches
Virginia Tech Hokies men's basketball coaches